Citizenship Studies is a bimonthly peer-reviewed interdisciplinary academic journal covering the study of citizenship and related concepts. It was established in 1997 with Bryan Turner (City University of New York and Australian Catholic University) as founding editor. The current editors-in-chief are Engin F. Isin (Queen Mary University of London and University of London Institute in Paris), Anne McNevin (New School for Social Research) and Peter Nyers (McMaster University). It is published by Taylor & Francis. According to the Journal Citation Reports, the journal has a 2017 impact factor of 1.240.

References

External links

Publications established in 1997
Multidisciplinary social science journals
Citizenship
Bimonthly journals
Taylor & Francis academic journals
English-language journals